"Go My Way" is Hitomi's 4th single from her album "Love Concent" and 31st single overall.

Overview
The lyrics for "Go My Way" and the b-side, "Lost Emotion in Darkness", were written by Hitomi herself. 

"Go My Way" was used as the opening and ending theme to the Japanese drama "Bengoshi No Kuzu" (Scum Lawyer Kuzu,) which aired on TBS. Hitomi appeared in the 6th episode to advertise her single release of the song. During the ending sequence, Hitomi also made a brief cameo. 

This has been Hitomi's most successful single since "Japanese Girl" was released on June 1, 2005. "Lost Emotion in Darkness" has been the only b-side by Hitomi to be featured on her new album "Love Concent".

PV
The PV for this song features Hitomi dancing, and shows her in different outfits. The video also shows multiple scenes of a bird, known as the Galah cockatoo, flying across a room in slow motion.

Track listing

Charts
Oricon Sales Chart (Japan)

2006 singles
Japanese television drama theme songs
Hitomi songs
Song recordings produced by Zentaro Watanabe